6SV1 (Second Simulation of a Satellite Signal in the Solar Spectrum, Vector, version 1) is an advanced radiative transfer code designed to simulate the reflection of solar radiation by a coupled atmosphere-surface system for a wide range of atmospheric, spectral and geometrical conditions.
It belongs to the group of procedures called Atmospheric correction for the process of removing the effects of the atmosphere on the reflectance values of images taken by satellite or airborne sensors. The code operates on the basis of an SOS (successive orders of scattering) method and accounts for the polarization of radiation in the atmosphere through the calculation of the Q and U components of the Stokes vector. It is a basic code for the calculation of look-up tables in the MODIS atmospheric correction algorithm.

See also 
 List of atmospheric radiative transfer codes

References 
 S.Y. Kotchenova, E.F. Vermote, R. Matarrese, & F.J. Klemm, Jr., Validation of a vector version of the 6S radiative transfer code for atmospheric correction of satellite data. Part I: Path Radiance, Applied Optics, 45(26), 6726-6774, 2006.
 S.Y. Kotchenova & E.F. Vermote, Validation of a vector version of the 6S radiative transfer code for atmospheric correction of satellite data. Part II: Homogeneous Lambertian and anisotropic surfaces, Applied Optics, in press, 2007.

External links 
 https://salsa.umd.edu/6spage.html — 6SV1 Web site
 http://rtcodes.ltdri.org — Joint code comparison project
 http://modis-sr.ltdri.org — MODIS atmospheric correction group
 https://grass.osgeo.org/grass78/manuals/i.atcorr.html - 6S ported to GRASS GIS (i.atcorr) with support for additional sensors

Atmospheric radiative transfer codes